National Liberal Party is a centrist political party in El Salvador.

On March 12, 2006 legislative election, the party won no seats.

References

Liberal parties in North America
Political parties in El Salvador